Matt Leonard (born November 7, 1979) is a former professional American football defensive tackle in the National Football League (NFL). He played four games for the Jacksonville Jaguars in 2003, recording two tackles. He had a tenor.

References

1979 births
Living people
American football defensive tackles
Jacksonville Jaguars players
Stanford Cardinal football players